The Women's junior time trial of the 2016 UCI Road World Championships took place in and around in Doha, Qatar on 10 October 2016.

The gold medal was won by Dutch rider Karlijn Swinkels, who became the first Dutch rider to win the gold medal in the event. Swinkels finished 7.35 seconds ahead of her closest competitor, European champion Lisa Morzenti of Italy. The bronze medal went to Juliette Labous from France, 14 seconds down on Morzenti and 21.35 seconds in arrears of Swinkels.

Qualification

Qualification for the event

All National Federations were allowed to enter four riders for the race, with a maximum of two riders to start. In addition to this number, the outgoing World Champion and the current continental champions were also able to take part.

Schedule
All times are in Arabia Standard Time (UTC+3).

Final classification

References

Women's junior time trial
UCI Road World Championships – Women's junior time trial
2016 in women's road cycling